Daniel, Dan, or Danny Green may refer to:

Arts and entertainment
 Dan Green (artist), American comic book illustrator
 Dan Green (voice actor) (born 1975), American voice actor
 Danny Green (actor) (1903–1973), English actor

Sports

Association football
 Danny Green (footballer, born 1988), English footballer
 Danny Green (footballer, born 1990), English footballer
 Daniel Green (Jamaican footballer) (born 1997), Jamaican footballer

Other sports
 Daniel Green (athlete) (born 1996), Australian shot putter
 Dan Green (powerlifter) (born 1982), American powerlifter
 Danny Green (baseball) (1876–1914), American baseball player
 Danny Green (basketball) (born 1987), American basketball player
 Danny Green (boxer) (born 1973), Australian boxer

Other people
 Daniel Green (businessman) (born 1966), English businessman who pioneered solar energy to UK households
 Daniel Green (politician) (born 1955), Canadian scientific communicator

Fictional characters
Danny Green (The Last Ship), fictional US Navy lieutenant

See also
 Daniel Greene (disambiguation)